Lipa City Colleges located in Lipa City in the province of Batangas of the Philippines. Formerly known as Lipa Business Institute, it is a post-WW2 educational institution established in July 1947 by the late educators Ricardo and Marcela Bonilla. Its basic education department (K-12 level) is known as LCC Silvercrest School. 

Universities and colleges in Batangas
Education in Lipa, Batangas